Kharanaq District is in Ardakan County, Yazd province, Iran. At the 2006 National Census, its population was 3,195 in 1,001 households. The following census in 2011 counted 5,193 people in 864 households. At the latest census in 2016, the district had 4,666 inhabitants in 906 households.

References 

Ardakan County

Districts of Yazd Province

Populated places in Yazd Province

Populated places in Ardakan County